is a Japanese footballer currently playing as a forward for Blaublitz Akita.

Career statistics

Club
.

Notes

References

External links

Profile at Nagano

1997 births
Living people
Sportspeople from Miyagi Prefecture
Association football people from Miyagi Prefecture
Sanno Institute of Management alumni
Japanese footballers
Association football forwards
J2 League players
J3 League players
Vegalta Sendai players
AC Nagano Parceiro players
Blaublitz Akita players